Joseph William Knight (20 September 1896 – 3 March 1974) was an English first-class cricketer.

Knight was born at Highworth in September 1896. While studying at the University of Cambridge he made a single appearance in first-class cricket for Cambridge University against the British Army cricket team at Fenner's in 1921. Batting twice in the match, he was dismissed for a single run in the Cambridge first-innings by William Dickinson, while in their second-innings he was dismissed without scoring by Tom Jameson. Across the match he bowled 19 wicketless overs, conceding 53 runs. In addition to playing first-class cricket, Knight also played minor counties cricket for Wiltshire between 1920–23, making sixteen appearances in the Minor Counties Championship. He died in March 1974 at Childrey, Oxfordshire.

References

External links

1896 births
1974 deaths
People from Highworth
Alumni of the University of Cambridge
English cricketers
Wiltshire cricketers
Cambridge University cricketers